The 2007 Bay Classic Series was a series of criterium road cycling races held from 3  to 7 January 2007 around the west of Port Phillip Bay in Victoria, Australia.

The men's stages were approximately one-hour criteriums (45 minutes plus 10 laps) with three sprints at 15-minute intervals.  The women's stages were approximately 45-minute criteriums (30 minutes plus 10 laps) with two sprints at 15-minute intervals.  Points were awarded to the first 10 riders at the finish (12, 10, 8 to 1).  Points were awarded in the intermediate sprints to the first three places (3, 2 & 1 points) towards a separate sprint classification.  A team classification was calculated from the points of the highest ranked three riders in each team of five.

Men's results

Men's stage summary

Men's top 10 overall

Women's results

Women's stage summary

Women's top 10 overall

References
 Cyclingnews.com Jayco Bay Cycling Classic
 Day 1 summary
 Day 2 summary
 Day 3 summary
 Day 4 summary
 Day 5 summary

Bay Classic Series
International cycle races hosted by Australia
Bay Classic Series
Sport in Geelong
Bay Classic Series